Sugbaniate is a town in Greater Accra Region in southern Ghana, just north of the port at Tema.

Transport 

It is served by a station on the national railway network.

See also 

 Railway stations in Ghana

References 

Populated places in the Greater Accra Region